This is a list of culinary vegetables used in the cuisine of Assam.

Leafy vegetables

Non-leafy vegetables

Beans and pulses

Spices

See also
 Cuisine of Assam
 Vegetable
 List of vegetables

Vegetables

Asian vegetables
Indian cuisine-related lists